Monte Legnone is a mountain of the Bergamo Alps in Lombardy, northern Italy. It is located between the valleys of Valsassina and Valtellina near Lake Como.It has a height of 2609 mt.

References

Mountains of the Alps
Mountains of Lombardy
Colico